Narrowhead may refer to:

Narrowhead catshark
Narrowhead garter snake

See also
Narrow Head, American rock band